Staraya Bryan (Khuushan Bereen) is a rural locality (a selo) in Zaigrayevsky District, Republic of Buryatia, Russia. The population was 665 as of 2010. There are 8 streets.

Geography 
Staraya Bryan is located 35 km south of Zaigrayevo (the district's administrative centre) by road. Atkhatay is the nearest rural locality.

References 

Rural localities in Zaigrayevsky District